Branžež is a municipality and village in Mladá Boleslav District in the Central Bohemian Region of the Czech Republic. It has about 200 inhabitants.

Administrative parts
Villages of Nová Ves are Zakopaná are administrative parts of Branžež.

References

Villages in Mladá Boleslav District